In Roman mythology, Saritor was the god of hoeing and weeding. His name was invoked during the Cerealia, along with the other 11 helper gods of Ceres.

References

Agricultural gods
Roman gods
Helper gods of Ceres